Allies and Aliens is a single-volume work encompassing the novels The Torch of Honor and Rogue Powers by Roger MacBride Allen. The two works were published in 1985 and 1986, respectively, and Allies and Aliens was published in 1995.

1995 American novels
American science fiction novels
Novels by Roger MacBride Allen
Baen Books books